The Shad River is a  tidal river in the U.S. state of Georgia.  It is a tributary of the Bull River and flows through salt marshes connected to Wilmington Island in Chatham County.

See also
List of rivers of Georgia

References 

USGS Hydrologic Unit Map - State of Georgia (1974)

Rivers of Georgia (U.S. state)
Rivers of Chatham County, Georgia